Onais Greg Lewis Bascome (born 25 May 1995) is a Bermudian international cricketer. He represented the Bermudian national team in two matches at the 2014 World Cricket League Division Three tournament.

Bascome is the younger brother of Oronde Bascome, who has also played international cricket for Bermuda. He first played at an international level in July 2013, when he represented the Bermuda under-19s at the 2013 Americas Under-19 Championship in Canada. In August 2014, he represented a combined ICC Americas under-20 team at the West Indian regional under-19 tournament. Bascome's full international debut came at the 2014 WCL Division Three tournament in Malaysia. He appeared in his team's final two matches, against Uganda and the United States.

In August 2019, he was named in Bermuda's squad for the Regional Finals of the 2018–19 ICC T20 World Cup Americas Qualifier tournament. He made his Twenty20 International (T20I) debut for Bermuda against the United States on 18 August 2019. In September 2019, he was named in Bermuda's squad for the 2019 ICC T20 World Cup Qualifier tournament in the United Arab Emirates. Ahead of the tournament, the International Cricket Council (ICC) named him as the player to watch in Bermuda's squad. In November 2019, he was named in Bermuda's squad for the Cricket World Cup Challenge League B tournament in Oman. He made his List A debut, for Bermuda against Hong Kong, on 3 December 2019.

In October 2021, he was named in Bermuda's squad for the 2021 ICC Men's T20 World Cup Americas Qualifier tournament in Antigua.

References

External links

1995 births
Living people
Bermudian cricketers
Bermuda Twenty20 International cricketers